The Chester Masonic Lodge and Community Building is a historic community building in Chester, Arkansas.  It is a two-story rectangular wood-frame structure, designed to house a church and community space on the ground floor, and Masonic lodge facilities on the upper floor.  It was built in 1942, replacing a 1903 building of similar function that stood at another location and was torn down to build a school.  Significant elements of the old building (most notably its windows and parts of its framing) were reused in the construction of the new building.

The building was listed on the National Register of Historic Places in 2000.

See also
National Register of Historic Places listings in Crawford County, Arkansas

References

Clubhouses on the National Register of Historic Places in Arkansas
Masonic buildings completed in 1942
Buildings and structures in Crawford County, Arkansas
Masonic buildings in Arkansas
1942 establishments in Arkansas
National Register of Historic Places in Crawford County, Arkansas